Gladewater is a city in Gregg and Upshur counties in the U.S. state of Texas with a 2020 census population of 6,134.

In the early 20th century, Gladewater was an oil boom town. In 1995, the Texas Legislature proclaimed it the "Antique Capital of East Texas."

History

Gladewater was founded by the Texas and Pacific Railway Company in 1873 on land bought from Jarrett Dean and Anderson White. A community called St. Clair,  to the east, moved to Gladewater when the railroad announced that the only mail stop in the area would be there; residents from Point Pleasant, also bypassed by the railroad, moved to Gladewater. The first post office at Gladewater was established on August 22, 1873. The town's name probably originated from its proximity to Glade Creek, a tributary of the Sabine River that rose in a rather barren region called the Glades.

In 1874, Gladewater was incorporated with a mayor-alderman government. The incorporation lapsed, and a new charter was not obtained until 1931, when an influx of population necessitated organized city government. In 1955 Gladewater adopted a council-mayor form of government. The population grew slowly during the nineteenth century; the town had only 163 people in 1880 and 259 in 1900. In the area around Gladewater lumbering was a major activity, although farming was also important; cotton was the major crop. In 1908 the town had ten stores, one bank, two blacksmith shops, two hotels, a gin, a sawmill, and a planing mill. It continued to grow slowly until 1931.

On April 7, 1931, the first Gladewater oil well blew in. It was located  outside town in the Sabine River bottom. Oil production led to a population increase during the 1930s from about 500 to around 8,000 people. In 1940, after the oil boom, Gladewater had a population of 4,454. Civic improvements in the 1940s included an extensive paving project and a commercial airfield. Between 1940 and 1960 the population grew to 5,742. Lake Gladewater, constructed on Glade Creek in 1954, provides recreation for city residents.

During the 1970s Gladewater moved from an oil-oriented to a more diversified economy, primarily because of depletion of oil resources in the area. The movement of salt water into the western edge of the large East Texas Oil Field affected Gladewater first. By 1980 the town had a total of 6,548 residents, 4,311 in Gregg County and 2,237 in Upshur County. The economy in the 1980s depended on the oil industry and related activities and on the manufacture of such products as furniture, clothing, paper products, and boats. The lumber industry is also important, as is agriculture. By 1990 the community had become well known for its numerous antique stores. Important annual festivals include the East Texas Gusher Days in April, the Gladewater Roundup Rodeo in June, the Arts and Crafts Festival in September, and Christmas in November. Gladewater is seen as an important antiques hub and has earned the slogan "Antique Capital of East Texas".

In 1935, the Boston Red Sox franchise had a minor league baseball team in Gladewater, the Gladewater Bears. The minor league stadium has since been turned into a city park. The predominant features of the stadium are long gone, but the stadium is located near the Lee Building in Gladewater.

Geography 
It is located in western Gregg County and southern Upshur County at  (32.542666, –94.946950), primarily within Gregg County. U.S. Route 80 leads east  to Longview and west  to Big Sandy. U.S. Route 271 crosses US 80 in the center of Gladewater, leading north  to Gilmer and southwest  to Tyler.

The Sabine River forms the southwest border of the city.

Demographics

As of the 2020 United States census, there were 6,134 people, 2,122 households, and 1,283 families residing in the city.

At the census of 2000, there were 6,078 people, 2,257 households, and 1,593 families residing in the city. The population density was 523.7 people per square mile (202.1/km2). There were 2,601 housing units at an average density of 224.1 per square mile (86.5/km2). The racial makeup of the city in 2000 was 79.80% White, 16.12% African American, 0.82% Native American, 0.58% Asian, 0.02% Pacific Islander, 1.58% from other races, and 1.09% from two or more races. Hispanic or Latinos of any race were 3.50% of the population in 2000. By 2020, the majority of its population remained predominantly non-Hispanic white, though African Americans remained the second largest group with Hispanics or Latinos of any race comprising 14.8% of the population at the following census estimates.

The median income for a household in the city was $28,118, and the median income for a family was $32,278 in 2000. Males had a median income of $24,770 versus $23,271 for females. The per capita income for the city was $14,317. About 15.5% of families and 19.6% of the population were below the poverty line, including 24.9% of those under age 18 and 20.9% of those age 65 or over. In 2020, the American Community Survey estimated the median household income was $40,000.

Education
The city is served by the Gladewater Independent School District, home of the Gladewater Bears.

School buildings include:
 Gladewater Primary School formerly Gay Avenue Primary School
 Weldon Elementary School
 Gladewater Middle School
 Gladewater High School
 Truman W. Smith High School

Other school districts serving parts of the city are:
 Union Grove Independent School District
 Sabine Independent School District

Media
The newspaper Gladewater Mirror has been published in the community since 1949.  It first was a daily newspaper from 1949 to 1968, and then became a weekly newspaper.

Notable people

 Michael Bowen, actor and member of the Carradine family
 Skip Butler, former punter for the Houston Oilers
 John Floyd, former wide receiver with the San Diego Chargers
 Winston Hill, (1941–2016), professional offensive tackle
 Tony Jeffery, NFL player
 Chris Johnson, defensive back for the Oakland Raiders
 Joe R. Lansdale, award-winning author
 Harding Lawrence, president and chairman of Braniff International Airways
 Daylon Mack, NFL Player 
 Delmonico Montgomery, cornerback in the NFL and defensive specialist in the Arena Football League
 James Scott, former Chicago Bears wide receiver
 John Ben Shepperd (1915–1990), former state attorney general and civic leader
 Lovie Smith, head football coach, NFL
 Kelcy Warren, billionaire oil businessman, born in Gladewater

References

External links

 City of Gladewater official website
 Gladewater Chamber of Commerce

Cities in Gregg County, Texas
Cities in Upshur County, Texas
Cities in Texas
Longview metropolitan area, Texas